Ballet Theatre of Maryland is Maryland's premier professional [Ballet company] and is based in Annapolis, Maryland. Originally established as The Ballet Theatre of Annapolis, the organization was founded in November 1978 as a private non-profit corporation governed by a twelve-person Board of Trustees, with Danny Diamond as the first Artistic Director, and established residency at Maryland Hall for the Creative Arts in Annapolis. In 1996, the company achieved professional status. In 2000, the organization’s name was changed to Ballet Theatre of Maryland, Inc. (BTM) to fulfill a new mission of serving the State of Maryland. Dianna Cuatto joined BTM as Artistic Director at the start of the 2003-2004 season and has since won numerous awards for her choreography with BTM.  Dianna Cuatto is now honored with the title of Artistic Director Emeritus. The current Artistic Director, Nicole Kelsch, was appointed for the 2020-2021 season after being a Principal Dancer, School Principal, and Ballet Mistress for 14 years.

The Ballet Theatre of Maryland professional company aims to inspire its audience through the transforming power of American dance. Energy, athleticism, dynamism, and passion are classic American dance ideals that move the dancers to achieve higher levels of artistry and skill, whether through the drama of contemporary pieces or by making classic ballet storytelling come to life.

BTM produces high-caliber ballet performances that engage the mind and spirit and express Maryland’s unique voice through movement. BTM's goal is to make ballet accessible to all while attaining ever-higher levels of artistic excellence.

Explore more of the Ballet Theatre of Maryland by visiting http://www.balletmaryland.org

2022-2023 season includes, 

Les Sylphides and Other Works (MDH October 7-9, 2022)
The Nutcracker (MDH Dec 10,11,17,18, 2022) 
           
Momentum (MDH Feb 24-25, 2023)
Don Quixote (MDH April 28–29, 2023)

Dancers

The Company 
As of August 2022:

Principals 

 Lindsey Bell
 Emily Carey
 Alexander Collen
 Karissa Kralik
 Lauren Martinez
 Ryan Massey

Soloists 
As of August 2022:

 Aaron Bauer
 River Byrd
 Cindy Case
 Isaac Martinez
 Victoria Siracusa
 Michael West Jr.

Demi-Soloists 
As of August 2022:

 Caroline Anderson
 Amanda Cobb
 Carrie Cornelius
 Anne Gutcher
 Hannah Hanson
 Cassandra Hope
 Sarah Jung
 Brenna Mazzara
 Clara Molina
 Madison Sweeney
 Rowan Treece
 Catherine Welch

Apprentices 
As of August 2022:

 Destiny Billot
 Karen Fleming
 Olivia Fohsz
 Jenna Fritts
 Meredith Hardin
 Sarah Hoffman
 Madeline Jones
 Mia Koshansky
 Emma Lane
 Audrey Martin
 Rachael Spicer
 Julia Walden
 Victoria Walpole
 Isabella Warshaw

Trainees
As of August 2022:

 Arielin Anderson
 Samantha Apgar
 Jillian Battle
 Louisa Belian
 Kristen Faraclas
 Gabriella Femia
 Lauren Geary
 Ellie Goods
 Emily Moreland
 Kathryn Muscarella
 Addison Palmer
 Eliza Sell

Ballet Theatre of Maryland's School 
BTM's School of Classical and Contemporary Dance, founded in 1978, is the only school in Maryland with a fully comprehensive classic and contemporary ballet training program for beginning through pre-professional and apprentice students of dance. Classes are currently offered in Annapolis and Grasonville, MD.

The school's professional faculty trains students from an anatomically based syllabus with expertise in styles from such schools as the American Ballet Theatre, Ballet West, Connecticut Ballet Theatre, Richmond Ballet, Royal Danish Ballet, and San Francisco Ballet.

References

External links 
  
 
 
 Maryland Hall

Theatres in Maryland
1988 establishments in Maryland
Maryland, Ballet Theatre of
Annapolis, Maryland
Tourist attractions in Annapolis, Maryland
Performing groups established in 1988
Dance in Maryland